Peaseholme House or Peasholme House is a Georgian building on St Saviour's Place, near Peasholme Green in York, England.

It was built  probably by John Carr for a carpenter named Richard Heworth. It is Grade II* listed.

It has "strange rustication", with red brick in the front and orange brick at the back.

References

Houses in North Yorkshire
Grade II* listed buildings in York